Outta Time may refer to:

 "Outta Time" (Bryson Tiller song), 2020
 "Outta Time" (Natalia Kills song), 2013
 "Outta Time", a 2014 song by Future from the album Future
Outta Time, a 2002 film featuring George Lopez

See also
Out of Time (disambiguation)